Sir William Daniel Campbell Williams  (30 July 1856 – 10 May 1919) was an Australian surgeon.  He was surgeon general and Knight of Grace of the Order of St John of Jerusalem.

Williams was born in Sydney.  He studied medicine at University College (M.R.C.S., 1879; L.R.C.P., 1880). In 1883, he was staff surgeon of the New South Wales Artillery at the rank of captain.

He reorganized the medical service in 1888 including to start the Permanent Medical Staff Corps. There he designed light ambulance wagons, which attracted notability in the Sudan and which were more advanced than those in the British Royal Army.

Williams was promoted surgeon general and made a Companion of the Order of the Bath in January 1901.

He served in the Australian Army Medical Corps in World War I, for which he was made a Knight Commander of the Order of St Michael and St George in the 1916 Birthday Honours.

References
C. E. W. Bean, The Story of Anzac, vols 1, 2 (Sydney, 1921, 1924)
C. E. W. Bean, The A.I.F. in France, 1916 (Sydney, 1929)
A. G. Butler (ed), Official History of the Australian Army Medical Services in the War of 1914-1918 (Melbourne, 1938)
C. E. W. Bean, Two Men I Knew (Sydney, 1957)
J. Gurner, The Origins of the Royal Australian Army Medical Corps (Melbourne, 1970)
 Murray, P.L., Official Records of the Australian Military Contingents to the War in South Africa, (Melbourne), Albert J. Mullett, Government Printer, 1911.
R. L. Wallace, The Australians at the Boer War (Canberra, 1976)
Medical Journal of Australia, 31 May 1919, 17 Apr 1948
Australian Army Journal, Oct 1958
Tyquin, Michael B. Sir William 'Mo' Williams, KCMG, CB, KStJ, creator of Australia's army medical services - maligned or misunderstood? Journal of the Royal Australian Historical Society, June 1998.
Tyquin, Michael B. (2003). Little by Little: a Centenary History of the Royal Australian Army Medical Corps. Loftus, NSW, Australia: Australian Military History Publications. .

External links
Sir William Daniel Campbell Williams (1856–1919) in the Australian Dictionary of Biography

Australian surgeons
1919 deaths
1856 births
Knights Commander of the Order of St Michael and St George
Companions of the Order of the Bath
Knights of Grace of the Order of St John